The Drive is an oil on canvas painting of 1916–17 by the Canadian artist Tom Thomson. It depicts the logging industry in Algonquin Park. A frequent subject of Thomson's work, the painting shows timbermen directing sawn logs down a canal towards the Ottawa River. It was based on sketches of Thomson's composed while he was a fire ranger in the park.

References

1916 paintings
Paintings by Tom Thomson